Pappa e ciccia (also known as  Two of a Kind) is a 1983 Italian comedy film directed by Neri Parenti.

Plot
First segment: Nicola Calore, an Apulian mason who emigrated in Switzerland, faces the visit of his  niece Rosina who believes that he has become wealthy.

Second segment: the misadventures that occurred to two surveyors during their stay in a holiday village in Kenya.

Cast

Lino Banfi: Nicola Calore / Capitano Tombale
Paolo Villaggio: Geometra / Infermiera
Milly Carlucci: Rosina Calore / Claudia  
Jacques Herlin: Herr Schmidt
Pippo Santonastaso: Guido Colzi
Marina Confalone: Antonia 
Antonio Allocca: Pino 
Roberto Della Casa: Goffredo

References

External links
 

1983 films
Italian comedy films
1980s Italian-language films
1983 comedy films
Films directed by Neri Parenti
Films scored by Bruno Zambrini
Films set in Switzerland
Films set in Kenya
Films about immigration
1980s Italian films